Maria Kirilenko was the defending champion, but lost in the quarterfinals to Ekaterina Makarova.

Yanina Wickmayer defeated Ekaterina Makarova in the final, 7–5, 6–2. It was Wickmayer's first career title.

Seeds

Draw

Finals

Top half

Bottom half

External links
Main Draw
Qualifying Draw

2009 Estoril Open - Women's Singles
2009 WTA Tour
2009 Estoril Open